Megachile albopunctata is a species of bee in the family Megachilidae. It was described by Peter Jörgensen in 1909.

References

Albopunctata
Insects described in 1909